Clettharina is a genus of moths of the family Nolidae. The genus was erected by George Hampson in 1894.

Species
 Clettharina macrocorema Holloway, 2003
 Clettharina nitens Hampson, 1894

References

Chloephorinae